Nephele discifera is a moth of the family Sphingidae. It is known from forests from Liberia and Ghana to Congo and Uganda.

References

Nephele (moth)
Moths described in 1891
Moths of Africa